María Viola Corella Manzanilla (born 5 October 1939) is a Mexican politician affiliated with the National Action Party. She served as Deputy of the LIX Legislature of the Mexican Congress as a plurinominal representative after having previously served in the Congress of Sonora.

References

1939 births
Living people
Politicians from Sonora
Women members of the Chamber of Deputies (Mexico)
Members of the Chamber of Deputies (Mexico)
National Action Party (Mexico) politicians
21st-century Mexican politicians
21st-century Mexican women politicians
People from Magdalena de Kino
Members of the Congress of Sonora
Deputies of the LIX Legislature of Mexico